Suspended animation in fiction is the temporary halting of life processes of fictional characters followed by their later revival.

The process often serves as a plot device and is used in innumerable science fiction stories as a means to transport a character from the past into the future (a form of forward-only time travel) or to aid interstellar space travel which requires a long journey of months or years (See Space travel in fiction). Often, in addition to accomplishing whatever the character's primary task is in the future, he or she must cope with the strangeness of a new world, which may contain only traces of his or her previous surroundings. In some instances, a character is depicted as having skills or abilities that have been lost to society during their period of suspension, allowing them to function as a heroic figure in their new time.

Mechanisms
The mechanisms for the suspension and revival can vary widely. Early stories tend to use magical enchantment that induces a long sleep. Many modern stories attempt to portray it as scientific suspended animation or cryonics, while glossing over and ignoring most of the complexities. In many science fiction worlds, the difficulties of modern cryonics are resolved earlier than the invention of faster-than-light travel, and thus is used as a means to travel to other star systems.  In the fictional versions, all the cells are usually viable and the revival process is simple or even spontaneous. Many stories feature accidental freezing and use technobabble to explain how the characters survived the process.

Terms 
Terms used include cryosleep, hypersleep,  hibernation,  and soma.

Corpsicle
Corpsicle is a term that has been used in science fiction to refer to a corpse that has been cryonically cryopreserved. It is a portmanteau of "corpse" and "popsicle". Its earliest printed usage in the current form dates from 1969 in science fiction author Frederik Pohl's book The Age of the Pussyfoot, in which a corpsicle is referred to as "a zombie frozen in Alaska." The previous spelling, "corpse-sicle", also attributed to Pohl, appeared in the essay Immortality Through Freezing, published in the August 1966 issue of Worlds of Tomorrow. Larry Niven employed the term in Rammer (1971), a short story in his collection A Hole in Space, originally published in Galaxy Science Fiction, later enlarged into the novel, A World Out of Time (1976). Niven's protagonist is awakened in a society which gives no legal rights whatsoever to corpsicles.  Ben Bova uses the term in his 2001 novel The Precipice. In this novel, many subjects have been cryonically preserved; however those who are revived have lost all their memories.  In cinema, the term features in Paul W. S. Anderson's Event Horizon (1997), albeit used to refer to frozen remains with no hope of revival.

Literature

Some form of suspended animation often occurs as an element in many king asleep in mountain stories, a genre in which folk heroes from past eras are believed to be sleeping or otherwise kept alive for extended periods until they are needed to return to deal with some great peril, for example, Holger Danske or King Arthur.

In the classic fairy tale of Sleeping Beauty, a princess is cursed to sleep for 100 years by an evil fairy, where she would be awakened by a king's son. When the good fairy hears this, she knew that the princess would be frightened if she found herself alone when she wakes up. So the fairy uses her wand to put every living person and animal in the palace to sleep until the princess awakes.

In Shakespeare, several tales (Romeo and Juliet, Cymbeline) employ plot devices of a drug which induces a suspended animation state which is indistinguishable from death.

In American fiction, one of the first stories to deal with suspended animation is the tale of Rip Van Winkle, a short story by American author Washington Irving published in 1819 as well as the name of the story's fictional protagonist. In the story, a British subject in the American colonies wanders into the Catskill Mountains in the years before the American Revolutionary War, and finds a group of fairies, whose moonshine he drinks. He then falls asleep for 20 years, and returns to his village in what is now the United States, finding his home town and country utterly changed. The story has become a prototype for social dislocation tales of the type.

Science fiction literature mentions 
Notable later science fiction short stories of the 19th century featuring suspended animation, deliberate or accidental, include Mary Shelley’s “Rodger Dodsworth: The Reanimated Englishman” (written 1826 but not published until 1863), Edgar Allan Poe's short story "Some Words with a Mummy" (1845), and Lydia Maria Child's short story "Hilda Silfverling, A Fantasy" (1845), Edward Bellamy's Looking Backward and Jack London's first published work "A Thousand Deaths" (1899).

In the 20th century science fiction featuring suspended animation include the notable V. Mayakovsky's Klop (1928), H.P. Lovecraft's "Cool Air" (1928), and Edgar Rice Burroughs' "The Resurrection of Jimber-Jaw" (1937).

The character of Buck Rogers was introduced in the August 1928 issue of the pulp magazine Amazing Stories. In the novella, Armageddon 2419 A.D., he is described as a World War I veteran who became trapped in a mine and was preserved for 500 years by mine gases, a mythology that continued in the 1930s radio show, Buck Rogers in the 25th Century. The subsequent film and television adaptations of Buck Rogers used variations of this plot device (see below).

The 1938 novella Who Goes There? by John W. Campbell Jr., featured a malevolent shapeshifting alien creature that crashed into Earth's polar regions millennia ago and was frozen by the extreme temperatures, only to be inadvertently thawed out and revived by human explorers in the 20th century. The story was the basis of the 1951 sci-fi horror film The Thing From Another World and its subsequent remakes.

Many of the subjects in these early stories are unwilling ones, although a 1931 short story by Neil R. Jones called "The Jameson Satellite", in which the subject has himself deliberately preserved in space after death, has been credited with giving Robert Ettinger the seed of the idea of cryonics, when he was a teenager. Ettinger would later write a science fiction story called The Penultimate Trump, published in 1948, in which the explicit idea of cryopreservation of legally dead persons for future repair of medical causes of death is promulgated. Fictional application of suspended animation as rescue after freezing in space has continued since The Jameson Satellite in 1931. 

Arthur C. Clarke has used the concept of suspended animation in several of his works. In novels such as Childhood's End (1953), The Songs of Distant Earth (1986), and the Space Odyssey series (1968-1997), it is used to facilitate interstellar travel, allowing humans to endure journeys that take months, years, even decades. In the novel 3001: The Final Odyssey, it is revealed that Frank Poole, murdered by HAL 9000 in 2001: A Space Odyssey was cryopreserved by his exposure to the vacuum of space, and found and revived by advanced scientific methods a thousand years later.

In 1964, the comic book super-hero Captain America, popular in the 1940s and discontinued in the 1950s, returned to publication with the explanation that he had been accidentally frozen in the Arctic ice pack.

The Age of the Pussyfoot, a work of science fiction by Frederik Pohl, concerns a man who is revived from cryopreservation in the year 2527, having been killed in a fire 500 years earlier. This story was first published as a serial in Galaxy Science Fiction in three parts, starting in October 1966, and was later published as a novel in 1969.

Relatively few stories have been published concerning using cryonics for medical time travel. In the Edgar Allan Poe story mentioned above (1845), the electrically-revived mummy mentions that his Egyptian civilization uses mummification for time travel.

The most in-depth novel based on contemporary cryonics is the national best-seller The First Immortal by James L. Halperin (1998). Giles Milton's 2014 thriller The Perfect Corpse is set in a fictional cryonics laboratory in Nevada; the narrative revolves around the resurrection of a perfectly frozen body discovered in the Greenland ice sheet.

Film

Movies featuring suspended animation include Late for Dinner (1991), Forever Young (1992), Demolition Man (1993), Idiocracy (2006), Realive (2016), Sexmission (1984), the Woody Allen comedy Sleeper (1973), and Open Your Eyes (Abre los Ojos) (1997), remade as Vanilla Sky (2001).

The 1939 movie serial Buck Rogers, and its 1979 remake Buck Rogers in the 25th Century, both featured the title character being put into suspended animation during the 20th century for 500 years, thus emerging in a futuristic world far different from the one they belonged to. In the 1939 serial, the character (and his sidekick Buddy Wade) deliberately cryo-preserve themselves by using an experimental "Nirvano Gas", as they await rescue after their dirigible crashes over the North Pole. In the 1979 version, the character is an astronaut whose spacecraft inadvertently flies through a space phenomenon that freezes his life support systems (and himself) until his ship is found drifting in space in the year 2491.  

The 1984 film Iceman centered on a prehistoric man who was found and revived after being frozen for 40,000 years. Played dramatically in that film, the same concept was used for comedic effect in the 1992 film Encino Man. In both films, the prehistoric individual was depicted as having been flash-frozen naturally, with no special preparation to permit survival of the freezing experience, and thawing with no apparent lasting damage to their physical or mental abilities. In Iceman, the scientists examining the caveman before his thaw speculate that something in his diet acted as a natural antifreeze to prevent cell crystallization.

Suspended animation (also referred to as "cryosleep", "hypersleep" or simply "hibernation") is used during space travel in the film 2001: A Space Odyssey (1968), and its sequel 2010: The Year We Make Contact (1984). It was also used in the 1968 film Planet of the Apes. It was similarly used in the film Alien (1979) and its various sequels and prequels. James Cameron, the director of the second film in the series (1986's Aliens) also used it in his 2009 film Avatar. Cryosleep was also used in Christian Alvart's Pandorum (2009), Christopher Nolan's Interstellar (2014), and in Morten Tyldum's Passengers (2016). 

The Empire Strikes Back (1980) involves the test freezing of Han Solo as proof of concept for suspension, though this was intended as a means of restraining prisoners for travel and caused temporary blindness upon his revival. 

Austin Powers (1997) and its sequels (1999, 2002) use suspended animation as a plot device to insert a 1960s spy character and archvillain into a world decades later in which their behavior and expectations are often jarringly outdated.

In the Marvel Cinematic Universe, Steve Rogers and Bucky Barnes are placed under suspended animation in World War II (as depicted in the films Captain America: The First Avenger and Captain America: The Winter Soldier) until their recovery by S.H.I.E.L.D. and Hydra in the 21st century. Following the events of Captain America: Civil War, Barnes is placed "on ice" once again in Wakanda while Shuri figures out how to cure him, and is recovered by the events of Black Panther.

In the 1943 movie serial Batman, Prince Daka, Batman's nemesis, uses the concept of suspended animation on a corpse transported from Japan in order to receive a message from Emperor Hirohito in the fifth chapter, which is fittingly titled "The Living Corpse".

Television
On television, suspended animation has appeared occasionally since the 1960s. In the original Twilight Zone (1961) "The Rip Van Winkle Caper". Suspended animation is used by a band of four thieves. It was prominently featured in the opening episode of the space adventure series Lost in Space (1965), in which a family of space travelers was placed in suspension for a five and a half year interstellar journey to a planet of the star Alpha Centauri. In the original series of Star Trek episode "Space Seed" (1967), 72 humans are found adrift in space in a state of suspended animation. Their leader, Khan Noonien Singh, is played by Ricardo Montalbán who reprised the role in the film Star Trek II: The Wrath of Khan (1982). Many elements of the "Space Seed" plot, including the cryogenic preservation of Khan and his followers, were used in the updated Star Trek Into Darkness (2013) with Khan played by Benedict Cumberbatch. The 1970s revival of Buck Rogers as a television series changed the origin story of its main character from that of a soldier preserved in a mine for 500 years to that of an astronaut on a deep space mission who became frozen for that length of time due to the failure of his life support systems.

The 1973 TV movie Genesis II by Gene Roddenberry, featured a premise very similar to Buck Rogers. 20th century NASA scientist Dylan Hunt (Alex Cord) is working on "Project Ganymede", a suspended animation system for astronauts on long-duration spaceflights. As chief of the project, he volunteers for the first multi-day test. He places himself in chemically induced hibernation in his lab deep inside Carlsbad Caverns, but an earthquake occurs and his lab is buried. The monitoring equipment is damaged and fails to awake him at the intended end of the test, and he awakens instead in 2133, emerging into a chaotic post-apocalyptic world. 

Producer David E. Kelley wrote well-researched portrayals of cryonics for the TV shows L.A. Law (1990), Picket Fences (1994), and Boston Legal (2005). In each case, a dying plaintiff petitions a court for the right to elective cryopreservation before death. Cryonics features as a plot element in the Castle episode "Head Case", where the episode's murder victim is recovered by a cryonics company before the team can discover the body, with the subsequent investigation being complicated by the legal battle to claim and analyse the body without jeopardizing the client's potential for future reanimation.

In the Star Trek: The Next Generation episode "The Neutral Zone" (1988), the 24th-century protagonists criticize cryonics despite its in-universe success, regarding it as "a fad" of primitive 20th-century people who were "afraid of death". In two comedy series, Red Dwarf (1988) and Futurama (1999), accidental long-term suspended animation is used as an initial plot device to permanently thrust a hapless contemporary protagonist into the far future. In the 2004 Australian Broadcasting Corporation's series Silversun, 550 people are cryonically suspended for 90 years as they travel to the new planet Silversun, 45 light years away from Earth. The series is set in the year 2050.  In 2010, a Spanish soap opera titled Aurora premiered on the television network Telemundo. The theme of this soap is suspended animation and everything centers around it. It tells the story of Aurora Ponce de Leon, a 20-year-old who is frozen by her father after her death from a rare and mysterious disease. She comes back to life 20 years later and finds out how everything changed after her death. She has to adjust to life 20 years later; to being chronologically 40 years old, but looking like her 20-year-old self.

In the Star Trek: Voyager episode "The Thaw" (1996), the crew discover members of an alien race who placed themselves into suspended animation 19 years earlier to escape the effects of a solar flare that ravaged their planet. The aliens' stasis pods are all linked to a central computer that enables their minds to live in a shared virtual reality while their bodies sleep. Though intended to be a virtual utopia, the simulation actually became a nightmare realm from which they cannot escape. In the episode "One", the crew of Voyager are placed in stasis pods for several weeks in order for them to survive crossing through a vast radiation-filled nebula. In the episode "Dragon's Teeth" (1999), Voyager encounters a warlike alien race called the Vaadwaur who placed themselves in suspended animation after losing an interplanetary war and their world become enveloped in a nuclear winter. Although they had planned to be suspended for only five years, the Voyager crew revives them 900 years after the event when the balance of power in their region of space has shifted significantly.

The 1999 South Park episode "Prehistoric Ice Man" mocked conventions about people being having difficulty adjusting to life in the future by depicting a man who was thawed after having been frozen for only 32 months, but who was unable to accept the changes in fashion and music in that period. The dilemma is resolved by the man being taken to live in Iowa, which is shown to be three years behind the rest of the country in such areas. In another episode, Cartman froze himself so he could unfreeze when the Nintendo Wii came out, but ended up far in the future.

In the series Doctor Who, Time Lords can enter a suspended state at will, though they have to learn how. This can allow brief survival without oxygen, and may be mistaken for death by those unfamiliar with the ability. In the serial "Destiny of the Daleks", the Doctor's companion Romana entered such a state after being captured by the titular cyborgs. They had her 'corpse' dumped outside, and she got up and walked away once they left. Suspended animation is a key element of the 1985 serial "Revelation of the Daleks", where the Doctor lands on a facility on the planet Necros where the wealthy are placed into suspended animation for future revival. Davros then uses the suspended bodies to create a new race of Daleks.

In the TV sitcom Mr. Meaty episode "Original Sin", Edward R. Carney, the founder of the Mr. Meaty food chain with his renowned pork rib recipe, cryogenically froze himself in 1904 in order to carry on the Mr. Meaty world domination in the future. 100 years later, Josh and Parker thaw him out (thinking that he might give them a raise if they did).

In The 100, during season 5, a group of prisoners awakes from cryopreservation after a little more than 100 years. They were on penal labor on a ship mining asteroids, but were put into cryopreservation for this period when the Earth had become temporarily uninhabitable.

Manga and anime
Faye Valentine, one of the main characters in Cowboy Bebop is actually around 77 years old, though only appears to be no more than 23 years old due to having been put into cryogenic freeze after a space shuttle accident, wherein she spent 54 years in cryogenic suspension and who, upon awakening from her cryogenic suspension, has to contend with her massive amount of debt that she had no means to pay, but she was also diagnosed with total amnesia, a stranger in a mysterious world that she was not a part of and did not understand, surrounded by people who claimed to be helping her, but were only there to take advantage of her naiveté, to the point that even her surname "Valentine" was merely a name given to her by the doctor, leaving the circumstances of her accident, her previous life, and even her real name all remain a mystery, and are only gradually revealed as the series progresses. Utterly betrayed by someone she thought she could trust after waking, Faye found herself burdened with even more debt, and the situation hardened her personality to an extreme degree. It is eventually hinted that she came from Singapore on Earth, and was the daughter of a very wealthy family, as the city's famous Merlion statue features prominently in scenes of her childhood, and that memories and an old video tape from her childhood showed her living in a large mansion and it is implied that the accident that lead to her cryogenic suspension was due to an accident with an orbital gate.

In the hit manga/anime of InuYasha and InuYasha: The Final Act, half-demon Inuyasha was sealed on the Sacred Tree of Ages for half a century due to a deep sleep from the sealing arrow fired by his own lover Priestess Kikyo. The process had stopped him from aging, even though possessing longevity from his demon side.

In Yashahime: Princess Half-Demon, the spinoff to InuYasha: The Final Act, an older Rin is in a state suspended animation and ceaseless slumber within the Sacred Tree of Ages for a whole decade at the request of her demon lover Sesshomaru.

Video games 

Suspended animation is found in numerous video games, including games such as Halo that use it as a means of preventing aging during lengthy interstellar travel.

In Portal (series) the Protagonist Chell wakes up from suspended animation
In Fallout 4, the main protagonist, the Sole Survivor, is in suspended animation through cryosleep as an experiment conducted by Vault-Tec in Vault 111.
In Mass Effect: Andromeda, the main protagonist, Pathfinder Ryder, along with entire arks full of passengers, are kept in cryosleep, while on a 600-year long journey to colonize the Andromeda Galaxy.
In The Legend of Zelda: Breath of the Wild, the main protagonist, Link, awakens from a century-long period of stasis without his memories after sustaining fatal injuries during a cataclysm known as the Great Calamity and being taken to a chamber known as the Shrine of Resurrection to heal. Princess Zelda, as a disembodied voice, awakens him at the beginning of the game and guides him on his quest to regain his memories and defeat Calamity Ganon.
In the upcoming seventh Dead or Alive game, the fighters from books are in frozen, sleep and suspended animated for many years until they are revived in the present day.
In The Outer Worlds, the main protagonist is a space colonist that was put into suspended animation during transport to the Halcyon Colony. Due to unforeseen circumstances the ship was forced to finish its journey at sub-light speeds, turning what should have been a 10-year trip to a 70-year trip. The scientists in the colony are unable to unfreeze the colonists due to the extended time they have spent in suspended animation, and research to fix the problem would impact the bottom-line of the Halcyon Holdings Company that administers the system, so the ship is dumped at the edge of the colony until a rogue scientist resuscitates the protagonist in an effort to disrupt the Halcyon Holding Company's grip over the system and save the rest of the colonists trapped in suspended animation.

See also
 :Category:Cryonics in fiction
 Sleeper ship
 Stasis (fiction)

References

 
Fantasy tropes